Cerovo may refer to:

Bosnia and Herzegovina
Cerovo, Neum

North Macedonia
Cerovo, Želino

Montenegro
Cerovo, Bijelo Polje
Cerovo, Nikšić

Serbia
Cerovo (Ražanj)
Cerovo mine, in Ražanj

Slovakia
Cerovo, Slovakia

Slovenia
Cerovo, Grosuplje
Dolnje Cerovo, in the Municipality of Brda
Gornje Cerovo, in the Municipality of Brda

See also
Cerova (disambiguation)